Widełka  is a village in the administrative district of Gmina Kolbuszowa, within Kolbuszowa County, Subcarpathian Voivodeship, in south-eastern Poland.

The village has a population of 2,200.

South of Widelka, there is at 50°11'31" N, 21°52'14" E a large substation, at which the only 750kV-powerline in Poland ends.

References

Villages in Kolbuszowa County